St. Xenia Serbian Orthodox Monastery is a women's monastic community of the Serbian Orthodox Church in North and South America, located at 40500 Highway 36 West in Wildwood, California since its founding in 1980. It is under the omophorion of Bishop Maksim Vasiljević of the Serbian Orthodox Eparchy of Western America. It is affiliated with the Monastery of St. Herman of Alaska in Platina, California and St. Herman Press.

The daily life of the nuns revolves around common and private prayers and work such as growing vegetables and flowers, hosting pilgrims and giving them tours of the monastery, making prayer ropes, and so on. In cooperation with St. Herman Press, St. Xenia sisterhood is also involved in publishing Orthodox works and other written material related to Orthodoxy
and adherence to the Nicene Creed.

See also
 St. Sava Serbian Orthodox Monastery, located at the Episcopal headquarters of the Serbian Orthodox Eparchy of Eastern America, Libertyville, Illinois
 New Gračanica Monastery, located at the Episcopal headquarters of the Serbian Orthodox Eparchy of New Gračanica and Midwestern America, Third Lake, Illinois
 Episcopal headquarters of the Serbian Orthodox Eparchy of Western America, located at Saint Steven's Serbian Orthodox Cathedral, Alhambra, California
 Holy Transfiguration Serbian Orthodox Monastery, Milton, Ontario, Canada
 Episcopal headquarters of the Serbian Orthodox Eparchy of Buenos Aires and South America, Buenos Aires, Argentina
 Monastery of St. Paisius, Safford
 St. Pachomious Monastery
 St. Archangel Michael Skete
 Saint Herman of Alaska Monastery
 St. Mark Serbian Orthodox Monastery

References 

Serbian Orthodox monasteries in the United States